Unión Deportiva Vall de Uxó is a football team based in La Vall d'Uixó, in Castellón province, autonomous community of Valencian Community, Spain. Founded in 1975, it plays in Regional Preferente – Group 1. Its stadium is José Mangriñán, which has a capacity of 4,000 seats.

History
Unión Deportiva Vall de Uxó was founded in 1975. Previously, there was another club from La Vall d'Uixó, CD Piel, but only played in regional divisions. CD Piel was dissolved in 1975.

Season to season

3 seasons in Segunda División B
16 seasons in Tercera División

Notable former coaches
 José Manuel Pesudo

References

External links
Official website
Futbolme.com profile

Football clubs in the Valencian Community
Association football clubs established in 1975
Divisiones Regionales de Fútbol clubs
1975 establishments in Spain